John David Fulton (born 7 December 1965) is a New Zealand former cricketer. He played three List A matches for Central Districts in 1993/94.

A batsman, Fulton is the most capped player for Manawatu, with 129 appearances between 1989 and 2006. He is also Manawatu's record run-scorer, with 5,230 runs, including 11 centuries.

Fulton works as the grounds turf supervisor at Massey University. He represented New Zealand at the first over-50s world cup in 2018.

References

External links
 

1965 births
Living people
New Zealand cricketers
Central Districts cricketers
Cricketers from Lower Hutt